El ojo de vidrio, (English: The glass eye) is a Mexican telenovela produced by Televisa and originally transmitted by Telesistema Mexicano.

Cast 
David Reynoso
Carmelita González
Jaime Fernández
Carlos Martínez Baena

References

External links 

Mexican telenovelas
Televisa telenovelas
Spanish-language telenovelas
1969 telenovelas
1969 Mexican television series debuts
1969 Mexican television series endings